Eight Charts (Chinese: 八阵图) is a Chinese television series.

Cast
Yu Bo as Xun Ri Zhao
Ada Choi (Cai Shao Fen) as Qian Xun
Kathy Chow Hoi-Mei as Han Die Yi
Yang Jun Yi as Xue Hin
Yang Guang as Tao Hua
Wang Jiu Sheng as Qian Chong 
Monica Chan as Shi Huan
Lu Xing Yu as An Lushan

External links
Eight Charts at the China Movie DataBase

2006 Chinese television series debuts
Mandarin-language television shows
Chinese drama television series